Åsunden is a lake in Västergötland, Sweden.

The lake is known from the Battle of Bogesund which took place on the ice and shore of the lake on January 19, 1520.  Christian II of Denmark prevailed over the Swedish regent Sten Sture the Younger, who was mortally injured.  Christian went on to be crowned King of Sweden later that year.

References 

Västergötland
Lakes of Västra Götaland County